Sir Thomas Fairfax ( – 31 March 1505) was the first member of the Fairfax family to own Gilling Castle, near Gilling East, North Riding of Yorkshire, England.

He was born Thomas Fairfax of Walton and was presumably a supporter of the House of York in the Wars of the Roses.  Fairfax's original home was near the Battle of Towton, which decided the outcome of that war.  From 1489 to 1492, he successfully claimed the ownership of the Gilling Estate during two inquisitions.  Before Fairfax, the de Etton family had owned this estate.  However, in 1349, Margaret de Etton, the sister of Thomas de Etton—who owned the estate at that time and erected its tower keep—married Fairfax's ancestor, also named Thomas Fairfax.  She entered an agreement that, should the de Etton family fail, the estate would be inherited by the Fairfax family.  Thus, historian John Marwood wrote that "it could be argued that the rightful heirs had at last come home."  When Fairfax received the estate, he became the Fairfax of Walton and Gilling.

In 1505, the castle was essentially a large tower designed to be defensible against hit-and-run Scottish raiders, but not a long siege.  According to historian John Marwood, this was the largest tower house in England.  The estate consisted of a water mill, 30 houses, 300 acres of attached land, 300 acres of wood and 1,000 acres of moor.

Fairfax became a Knight of the Bath in 1495.  He married Elizabeth Shireburn of Stonyhurst in Lancashire and had 10 children: his eldest son Thomas, who inherited the estate upon the elder Thomas' death; three other sons named Richard, Robert and John; and five daughters named Margaret, Jane, Elizabeth, Isabel, Anne and Dorothy.  According to Marwood, "there appears little to report from Thomas' life."

References

Thomas
English knights
People from Ryedale (district)
15th-century English people
16th-century English people
Wars of the Roses
Year of birth uncertain
1505 deaths
Knights of the Bath